The 1976 Central African Games was the inaugural edition of the international multi-sport event between the nations of Central Africa. It was held from 30 June – 10 July 1976 in Libreville, Gabon. A total of eleven nations competed in eight sports over the eleven-day competition, with a total of 1312 athletes in attendance.

The competition was distinct from the 1953 Central African Games, which was contested in Zambia between East Central African countries.

Sports

 (men only)

In the athletics programme, a total of 31 track and field events (19 for men, 12 for women) were held.

In the men's football final, held on 11 July at the Stade Omar Bongo before a crowd of 45,000, Cameroon defeated Republic of the Congo 3–2 through a goal by Roger Milla in the final minutes of extra time.

Participating nations

References

1976
International sports competitions hosted by Gabon
Sports competitions in Libreville
Central African Games
Central African Games
Central African Games
June 1976 sports events in Africa
July 1976 sports events in Africa
20th century in Libreville